Villers-la-Loue (Gaumais: Vilé l'Olu) is a village of Wallonia and a district of the municipality of Meix-devant-Virton, located in the province of Luxembourg, Belgium. 

The history of the settlement goes back to the time of the Roman Empire, when a Roman villa existed here. In 1225, the village is noted as being subservient to the lord of Cons-la-Grandville and the Abbey of Saint-Hubert. The village church, dedicated to Saint Hubert, was built in 1858. The village consists of several buildings from mainly the 18th and 19th centuries.

References

External links

Former municipalities of Luxembourg (Belgium)